The Hörsel is a  long river in Thuringia, Germany, right tributary of the Werra. It is formed by the confluence of two smaller rivers in Leinatal, at the northern edge of the Thuringian Forest. The Hörsel flows generally northwest through the towns Hörselgau, Wutha-Farnroda and Eisenach. It flows into the Werra in Hörschel, a village near Eisenach.

Course 
As with many rivers, the name of the middle and lower reaches of the Hörsel was only extended to the upper reaches in the 20th century.

Kleine Leina und (Wilde) Leina 

The Hörsel has its source as Kleine Leina in the Thuringian Forest in the immediate vicinity of the Rennsteig south of the 749 metre high Spießberga at the southern community border of Finsterbergen to Georgenthal. (both district of Gotha). The stream flows first to the northeast and passes different parts of Georgenthal.

After 8.4 kilometers of flow distance in the district Schönau vor dem Walde the Leinakanal branches off to the right. Shortly after, streams flow in from both sides. From Schönau vor dem Walde the small river turns to the north. In maps from the beginning of the 20th century the name Wilde Leina is written here. After the inflow of the Cumbach from Cumbach the name Leina-Hörsel. In the further course to the north the Schilfwasser coming from Ernstroda flows in from the left.

Hörsel 

In Leinatal-Leina after 16.3 kilometres with the inflow of the Altenwasser (also: Altes Wasser, from right) the name Leina ends completely. From here the river is called Hörsel and its course turns to the northwest.

In Wahlwinkel and Hörselgau the Badewasser flows in two arms from left. After passing Fröttstädt, the Asse flows into Teutleben from the right. The Hörsel takes over the direction of flow to the west and, after the inflow of the Laucha, the Asse flows into the Laucha. Mechterstädt

When reaching the Wartburgkreises the river crosses under the Bundesautobahn 4, flows south past the Hörselbergen through the communities Hörselberg-Hainich (district Sättelstädt with the left-sided tributary Emse) and Wutha-Farnroda, where the Erbstrom flows into Wutha from the left.

Then the Hörsel reaches Eisenach, where it takes in from the right the approximately equally strong Nesse and the much smaller Michelsbach, from the left the Löbersbach and the Roten Bach. Further west, in the Eisenach district of Hörschel - - the place of origin of the Rennsteigs - is its estuary (waters) into the Werra.

The total length of the river "Kleine Leina-Hörsel" is 48.5 km, over the 52.6 km long Nesse the Hörsel is even about 62 km long.

Tributaries 

The catchment area of the Hörsel is divided into two major landscapes. The headwaters Leina and left tributaries come from the Thuringian Forest, while all right tributaries come from the Thuringian Basin and its edge plates. Correspondingly, the upper reaches of the left tributaries are typical low mountain streams with deep gorges and a large bottom gradient, while the right tributaries are mostly lowland rivers with a small gradient, almost all of them flowing into the Hörsel via the Nesse. Today, their courses are mostly straightened and integrated into a system of drainage ditches.

The catchment area of the Nesse comprises 426.3 km2, 54.4% of the total catchment area of the Hörsel and 139.5% of the Hörsel catchment area above the Nesse estuary (305.6 km2). Thus, the Nesse brings about the same amount of water (3.14 m2/s) to unite with the Hörsel as the Hörsel itself (3.11 m2/s).

A pipeline from the Leina - and the (upper) Apfelstädt from the system Gera/Unstrut/Saale/Elbe - to the subsystem of the Nesse is the Leinakanal, which was already built in the Middle Ages to supply the city Gotha with water from the Thuringian Forest. The flow distance of the Hörsel over the upper reaches of the Leina, the Leina Canal, the Wilden Graben from the Leina Canal, the Nesse (middle and lower reaches) and the Hörsel Lower reaches is 8.4 + 29.5 + 9.8 + 26.0 = 73.3 km.

See also
List of rivers of Thuringia

References

Rivers of Thuringia
Rivers of Germany